Walter William Grauman (June 17, 1915 – December 6, 2000) was an American professional basketball player. He played for the Sheboygan Red Skins in the National Basketball League and appeared in one game during the 1938–39 season.

References

1915 births
2000 deaths
American men's basketball players
Basketball players from Wisconsin
Guards (basketball)
Sheboygan Red Skins players
Sportspeople from Sheboygan, Wisconsin